was a Japanese voice actor and sound director.

Voice work

Television animation
 Astro Boy as Police Inspector Tawashi (second voice) in 1963 series and Dr. Hyde in 1980 series
 Big X as additional voices
 GaoGaiGar: King of the Braves as Cain
 Legendary Brave Da Garn as Ohboss
 Lupin the III as various roles in series part one and two
 Ronin Warriors as the narrator
 Urusei Yatsura as the school principal

OVA
 Giant Robo as Dr. Franken Von Folger
 Kaze to Ki no Uta as Professor Louie Renet

Theatrical animation
 Crusher Joe: The Movie as Corte Gianni
 Golgo 13: The Professional as The Watchmaker

Dubbing

Live-action
Burgess Meredith
Rocky (Mickey Goldmill)
The Return of Captain Nemo (Prof. Waldo Cunningham)
Rocky II (Mickey Goldmill)
Rocky III (1987 TBS edition) (Mickey Goldmill)
Rocky V (1994 NTV edition) (Mickey Goldmill)
Castle Keep (Lieutenant Billy Byron Bix (Bruce Dern))
Chariots of Fire (1985 TBS edition) (Sam Mussabini (Ian Holm))
Counterpoint (1973 TBS edition) (Col. Arndt (Anton Diffring))
Damien: Omen II (1981 TBS edition) (David Pasarian (Allan Arbus))
Dracula: Prince of Darkness (Klove (Philip Latham))
The Great Escape II: The Untold Story (Dr. Absalon (Donald Pleasence))
The Great Silence (Governor of Utah (Carlo D'Angelo))
Guess Who's Coming to Dinner (Monsignor Mike Ryan (Cecil Kellaway))
Battle Monsters (Chili Character-Chilli & Pepper)
Papillon (1977 TV Asahi edition) (Toussaint Leper colony chief (Anthony Zerbe))
The NeverEnding Story (1987 TV Asahi edition) (Cairon (Moses Gunn))
Suspiria (1979 TBS edition) (Professor Milius (Rudolf Schündler), Narrator)
Tower of Death (The Abbot (Roy Chiao))
Way of the Dragon (1977 NTV edition) (Colt (Chuck Norris))

Animation
 Batman: The Animated Series as Nostromos / Carl Fowler

Sound direction work
 Arion
 The Venus Wars
 SD Gundam (1988-1991)
 Ronin Warriors
 Dirty Pair (1985-1990)
 Crusher Joe: The Movie
 Dirty Pair Flash

References

External links
 

1931 births
2001 deaths
Japanese male video game actors
Japanese male voice actors
Male voice actors from Iwate Prefecture
Japanese sound designers
Japanese voice directors